Glipa formosana is a species of beetle in the genus Glipa. It was described by Píc in 1911.

References

formosana
Beetles described in 1911